Rimatara is the westernmost inhabited island in the Austral Islands of French Polynesia. Its population was 872 at the 2017 census.

The main villages are Amaru (the capital), Anapoto and Mutuaura.

Rimatara was one of the last Polynesian islands to receive European visitors. Captain Samuel Pinder Henry discovered the island in 1811. Two Tahitian missionaries from Bora Bora arrived in 1822 and established a Protestant mission. France established a protectorate in 1889 and annexed Rimatara in 1901.

Notable people 
 Tamaeva IV, queen of Rimatara
 Tamaeva V, queen of Rimatara

Administration

The commune of Rimatara consists of the island of Rimatara, and the uninhabited Maria Islets (Îlots Maria). Rimatara consists of the following associated communes: 
 Amaru
 Anapoto
 Mutuaura

References

External links

http://www.thetahititraveler.com/islandguide/rimataraintro.asp
 http://www.iero.org/sites/fenua/australes/rimatara/index.html

Islands of the Austral Islands
Communes of French Polynesia
1900 establishments in French Polynesia
1889 establishments in the French colonial empire
Endemic Bird Areas